GRAd-COV2 is a COVID-19 vaccine candidate developed by ReiThera Srl and Lazzaro Spallanzani National Institute for Infectious Diseases. It is based on a novel replication defective Gorilla Adenovirus and encodes for SARS-COV-2 full length prefusion stabilized Spike protein. More specifically, the vector used is the simian group C adenovirus GRAd32, isolated from a captive gorilla, with a genome deleted of the entire E1 and E3 regions and the native E4 region replaced with the E4 orf6 of human adenovirus 5 (hAd5).

References

External links 

Adenoviridae
Clinical trials
Italian COVID-19 vaccines
Science and technology in Italy
Viral vector vaccines